The Gatalog: A Collection of Chaos is a compilation album by underground rapper and Army of the Pharaohs/Demigodz member Celph Titled. The album was released with a four disc special. Mercer released a compilation titled The Gatalog, a four-disc set of his guest appearances and freestyles, going back to his early releases from 1998, as his official first offering to a thriving fanbase that already viewed him as a seasoned veteran. After the release of The Gatalog and a move back to Tampa, Mercer spent three years working with the Diggin' In The Crates (D.I.T.C.) multi-platinum producer, Buckwild, on his first album, Nineteen Ninety Now, released on October 26, 2010, on No Sleep Recordings.

Track listing

Disc 1

Disc 2

Disc 3

Disc 4

Additional track information
Disc 1
Track 2 from Megadef by Styles of Beyond
Track 3 from A Job Ain't Nuthin but Work by J-Zone
Track 4 from DC2: Bars of Death by 7L & Esoteric
Track 5 from Sin-A-Matic by Louis Logic
Track 6 from The Darkest Night Ever!!! by Black Panther
Track 8 from  Sloppy Seconds Vol. 2 by CunninLynguists
Track 10 from Put Ya Dukes Up by Apathy
Track 11 from The Rising Tied by Fort Minor
Track 12 from Junk Planet by DutchMassive
Track 13 from TM Radio by Time Machine
Track 14 from Who's Fuckin' Around/Bottom Line by K-Skills
Track 15 from Rock/I´ll Be Alright If You Stay For The Night by Lexicon
Track 16 from Farenheit 813/Windows 98/Critical Conditions by Equilibrium
Track 17 from Fortruss/The Countdown Theory by Walkmen
Track 18 from Do That/Hold Something by Equilibrium
Disc 2
Track 1 from Champion Sounds by DJ Skully
Track 2 from DC2: Bars of Death by 7L & Esoteric
Track 4 from All Out War by Terntable Jediz
Track 5 from A Job Ain't Nuthin But Work by J-Zone
Track 6 from Molesting Hip-Hop: The Official Mixtape by Majik Most
Track 8 from We Came From Beyond, Vol. 2

References

Celph Titled albums
2006 albums